Laberintos de pasión (English: Labyrinths of Passion) is a Mexican telenovela produced by Ernesto Alonso for Televisa in 1999-2000. It aired on Canal de Las Estrellas from October 4, 1999, to January 21, 2000, weekdays at 8:00pm.

From Monday, August 21, 2000, to Tuesday, December 12, 2000, it aired in the United States weeknights at 9/8c on  Univisión.

Leticia Calderón, Francisco Gattorno, César Évora and Mónika Sánchez starred as main characters.

"The Best Telenovela of the Year" (Premios TVyNovelas 2000)

Cast
 
Leticia Calderón as Julieta Valderrama
Francisco Gattorno as Pedro Valencia Miranda
César Évora as Gabriel Almada
Mónika Sánchez as Nadia Román Valencia/Nadia Casanova Guzmán
Manuel Ojeda as Don Genaro Valencia
Pedro Armendáriz Jr. as Father Mateo Valencia
Alma Delfina as Sofía Miranda Montero de Valencia
Azela Robinson as Carmina Roldán Montero de Valencia
Aarón Hernán as Lauro Sánchez
María Rubio as Doña Ofelia Montero
Abraham Ramos as Cristóbal Valencia Miranda
Tiaré Scanda as Rocío González Pascual
Eugenio Cobo as Arturo Sandoval
Silvia Manríquez as Sara Morales de Sandoval
Socorro Bonilla as Matilde Pascual de González
Héctor Sáez as Juan González
Roberto Antúnez as Don Miguel Valderrama
Fernando Robles as Rosendo Treviño
Luz María Jerez as Marissa Cervantes
Milton Cortés as Javier Medina
Amira Cruzat as Magdalena García
David Ramos as Diego Sandoval García
Antonio de la Vega as Benjamín Sandoval Morales
Nayeli Dainzu as Alejandra Sandoval Morales
José Antonio Ferral as Ponciano
Leonor Bonilla as Rebeca Fernández
Susana Contreras as Genoveva Camacho
Elisa Coll as Olivia Rocina
Linda Mejía as Ana Mary Caixba
Benjamín Islas as Florencio Zamora
Ricardo Vera as Commander Mendoza
Rubén Morales as Commander's Assistant
Yosy as Julieta Valderrama (child)
Raúl Castellanos as Pedro Valencia Miranda (child)
Eduardo de la Vega as Cristóbal Valencia Miranda (child)

Awards

References

External links

1999 telenovelas
Mexican telenovelas
1999 Mexican television series debuts
2000 Mexican television series endings
Spanish-language telenovelas
Television shows set in Mexico
Televisa telenovelas